Khansa is a crater on Mercury. It has a diameter of 111 kilometers. Its name was adopted by the International Astronomical Union (IAU) in 1976. Khansa is named for the Arab poet al-Khansa, who lived in the 6th century CE.

References

Impact craters on Mercury